Stanislav Stanislavovich Bunin (born 25 September 1966) is a Russian-born concert pianist.

He was born in Moscow in 1966 into an established European musical family which included his grandfather Heinrich Neuhaus, his grandmother Zinaida (Boris Pasternak's second wife), and his father, Stanislav Neuhaus.

In 1985, after a series of prizes, he won first prize and the gold medal in the XI International Chopin Piano Competition in Warsaw.  He spent much of the next decade in Japan, teaching for six years at Senzoku Gakuen Music College in the city of Kawasaki; his wife is Japanese. Having obtained German citizenship, in 2012 he was a resident in Japan.

Bunin recorded his interpretations of works by Haydn, Mozart and, most notably, Chopin. Those include works he played for the soundtrack to the 2007 video game Eternal Sonata.

References

1966 births
Living people
International Chopin Piano Competition winners
Long-Thibaud-Crespin Competition prize-winners
Russian classical pianists
Male classical pianists
Musicians from Moscow
21st-century classical pianists
21st-century Russian male musicians